Dowlatabad (also Romanized as Dowlatābād; also known as Dulyatabad) is a village in Zarjabad Rural District, Firuz District, Kowsar County, Ardabil Province, Iran. At the 2006 census, its population was 117, in 28 families.

References 

Towns and villages in Kowsar County